This is a list of the England national amateur football team results. Between their first match in 1906 and 1939, when competitive football stopped for the Second World War, England amateurs played in over 100 official matches. Throughout this period they participated in three Olympic Football Tournaments in 1908, 1912 and in 1920, winning the former two after beating Denmark in both finals. Throughout this period they also set a 18-match unbeaten run, starting off with a 15-0 win over France on 1 November 1906 in the team's first official game, and until they were finally beaten by Denmark (1-2) 4 years later, on 5 May 1910, courtesy of a late goal from Vilhelm Wolfhagen. Notable figures during these years was Vivian Woodward who scored 44 goals in just 30 official matches, including 6 hat-tricks against the likes of France (twice) and the Netherlands (twice).

Although the England amateur team was not created until 1906, the first appearance of an English team containing only amateur players dates back to 21 September 1901, when they beat a German touring side, 12-0, at White Hart Lane, London.

1900s

1901

1906

1907

1908

1909

1910s

1910

1911

1912

1913

1914

1919

1920s

1920

1921

1922

1923

1924

1925

1926

1927

1928

1929

1930s

1930

1931

1932

1933

1934

1935

See also 
 England national football team results (1900–1929)
 England national amateur football team results (1947–1974)
 List of England national amateur football team hat-tricks

Notes

References

External links 
 Results

1900s in England
1910s in England
1920s in England
1930s in England